The following people served as members of the Greater London Council, either as councillors or Aldermen. The polling days were:
 9 April 1964 (Aldermen elected on 27 April)
 13 April 1967 (Aldermen elected on 2 May)
 9 April 1970 (Aldermen elected on 28 April)
 12 April 1973 (Aldermen elected on 4 May)
 5 May 1977
 7 May 1981

A
 Frank Lewis Abbott (C): Wandsworth 1967–1970; Alderman 1970–1977
 Peter Ernest Anderson (Lab): Ealing 1964–1967
 John William Andrews (Lab): Greenwich 1964–1967, 29 June 1967 – 1973
 Geoffrey Weston Aplin (C): Croydon 1964–1973; Croydon South 1973–1981
 Anthony Francis Arbour (C): Surbiton 15 September 1983 – 31 March 1986
 Francis William Archer (Lab): Erith and Crayford 1973–1977
 Jeffrey Howard Archer (C): Havering 1967–1970
 David Ashby (C): Woolwich West 1977–1981
 John Leonard Aston (C): Croydon 1964–1970
 David James Avery (C): City of London and Westminster South 1981 – 31 March 1986

B
 George Nicholas Alexander Bailey (C): Brentford and Isleworth 1977 – 31 March 1986
 Lawrence Arthur Bains (C): Haringey 1967–1973; Hornsey 1973–1981
 David Gilbert Baker (C): Alderman 1967–1970
 Richard Andrew Balfe (Lab): Dulwich 1973–1977
 Maud Ball (Lab): Barking 1964–1970
 Frank Banfield (Lab): Alderman 1964 – 31 March 1970
 Tony Banks (Lab): Hammersmith 1970–1973; Fulham 1973–1977; Tooting 1981 – 31 March 1986
 Benita Dorothy Barham (C): Bromley 1964–1970
 Dudley Eric Reynolds Barker (Lab): Croydon North West 1973–1977
 Phillip John Bassett (Lab): Carshalton 1973–1977
 Robert Brian Bastin (Lab): Lewisham 1970–1973
 Brian Caldwell Cook Batsford (C): Alderman 1967 – 22 April 1970
 Edwin Bayliss (Lab): Islington 1964–1967
 Anthony William Bays (C): Upminster 1981 – 31 March 1986
 Neville Beale (C): Finchley 1981 – 31 March 1986
 Edith Gordon Beecher-Bryant (C): Bromley 1964–1970
 Roland Charles Beecher-Bryant (C): Bromley 1970–1973
 Edward Percy Bell (Lab): Newham 1964–1973; Newham South 1973–1981
 William Archibald Ottley Juxon Bell (C): Kensington and Chelsea 1970–1973; Chelsea 1973 – 31 March 1986
 Vivian Bendall (C): Croydon 1970–1973
 Francis Ernest Herman Bennett (C): Alderman 1964–1977
 Alfred Abram Berney (C): Brent 1967–1973
 Peter Blair Black (C): Barnet 1964–1973; Hendon South 1973 – 31 March 1986
 Christopher Bland (C): Lewisham 1967–1970
 Timothy James Bligh (C): Alderman 1967 – 12 March 1969
 Paul Boateng (Lab): Walthamstow 1981 – 31 March 1986
 Stanley Charles Bolton (C): Merton 1970–1973; Wimbledon 1973 – 31 March 1986
 Louis Wolfgang Bondy (Lab): Camden 1964–1967; Islington 1970–1973; Islington North 1973–1981
 Iris Mary Caroline Bonham (Lab): Hammersmith 18 June 1964 – 1967 and 1970–1973; Hammersmith North 1973–1977
 Gerald Bowden (C): Dulwich 1977–1981
 Samuel Boyce (Lab): Newham 1964–1973
 Anthony Vincent Bradbury (C): Wandsworth 1967–1970
 Sheila Mary Bradley (C): Greenwich 1967 – 24 May 1967
 Ashley Bramall (Lab): Tower Hamlets 1964–1973; Bethnal Green and Bow 1973 – 31 March 1986
 John Patrick Branagan (Lab): Tower Hamlets 1964–1973; Stepney and Poplar 1973 – 31 March 1986
 Richard Maddock Brew (C): Alderman 8 October 1968 – 1973; Chingford 1973 – 31 March 1986
 Bernard Brook-Partridge (C): Havering 1967–1973; Romford 1973 – 21 May 1985
 Bernard Joseph Brown (C): Hillingdon 1967–1973; Ruislip-Northwood 1973–1977
 Steve Bundred (Lab): Islington North 1981 – 31 March 1986
 Richard Brownrigg Butterfield (C): Camden 1967–1970

C
 Audrey Elizabeth Callaghan (Lab): Alderman 1964–1970
 Leila Campbell (Lab): Camden 1964–1967
 Ewan Geddes Carr (Lab): Alderman 28 April 1970 – 1973; Vauxhall 1973 – 17 December 1979
 John Adam Carr (Lab): Hackney Central 1981 – 31 March 1986
 Dennis Annesley Carradice (Lab): Ilford South 1973–1977
 Bryan Cassidy (C): Hendon North 1977 – 31 March 1986
 Edward Cyril Castle (Lab): Alderman 1964–1970
 Florence Cayford (Lab): Islington 1964–1967
 Christopher Charles Henry Chalker (C): Hillingdon 1967–1970
 David Walter Chalkley (Lab): Lewisham 1964–1967 and 1970–1973; Deptford 1973–1981
 Irene Chaplin (Lab): Islington 1964–1967; Hackney 1967–1973; Hackney South and Shoreditch 1973–1977
 Geoffrey Chase-Gardner (C): Hounslow 1967–1973
 Christopher Chataway (C): Alderman 1967 – 22 April 1970
 Alfred Frederick Joseph Chorley (Lab): Alderman 1964–1970, 4 May 1971 – 1977
 Frederick Denis Christian (C): Richmond-upon-Thames 1964–1967
 Charles James Christopher (Lab): Alderman 1964–1967
 Jill Elizabeth Clack (C): Harrow Central 1981 – 31 March 1986
 William Sydney Clack (C): Harrow 1970–1973; Harrow Central 1973–1981
 James Albert Edward Collins (Lab): Waltham Forest 1964–1967
 John Stewart Collins (C): Hammersmith 1967–1970
 Richard Collins (Lab): Camden 1970–1973; Alderman 1973–1977; Holborn and St. Pancras South 1977 – 1 December 1978
 John Alfred Boris Connors (C): Enfield North 1977–1981
 Frank Arthur Cooper (Lab): Hendon North 1973–1977
 Sonia Copland (C): Lewisham East 1977–1981; Carshalton 1981 – 31 March 1986
 Harry William Corpe (C): Edmonton 1977–1981
 John Rowland Wilton Cox (C): Hillingdon 1970–1973
 Robert John Crane (Lab): Barking 1967–1973; Dagenham 1973-13 October 1974
 Malby Sturges Crofton (C): Lambeth 1970–1973; Ealing North 1977–1981
 Horace Cutler (C): Harrow 1964–1973; Harrow West 1973 – 31 March 1986

D
 James Daly (Lab): Brentford and Isleworth 1973–1977
 Gareth John Daniel (Lab): Ealing North 1981 – 31 March 1986
 Countess of Dartmouth (Raine Legge) (C): Richmond-upon-Thames 1967–1973
 Peter John Dawe (Lab): Leyton 1981 – 31 March 1986
 Bryn Davies (Lab): Vauxhall 21 February 1980 – 21 May 1985
 David John Davies (Lab): Hillingdon 1964–1967
 Neil Davies (Lab): Woolwich West 1981 – 31 March 1986
 Evelyn Joyce Denington (Lab): Camden 1964–1967; Islington 1967–1973; Islington Central 1973–1977
 Gladys Felicia Dimson (Lab): Haringey 1964–1967; Wandsworth 1970–1973; Battersea North 1973 – 2 May 1985
 Gordon Laurence Dixon (C): Enfield 1964–1970
 John Chaytor Dobson (C): Ealing 1970–1973; Acton 1973 – 31 March 1986
 Jack Dunnett (Lab): Hounslow 1964–1967

E
 Douglas Eden (Lab) (Ind): Feltham and Heston 1973–1977
 Richard Edmonds (Lab): Hammersmith 1964–1967
 Arthur Frank George Edwards (Lab): Newham 1964–1973; Newham North West 1973 – 31 March 1986
 Arthur George Edwards (Lab): Alderman 1964–1967; Hammersmith 1970–1973
 Keith Andrew Edwards (C): Croydon 1964–1967
 George Frederick Everitt (C): Sutton 1964–1973

F
 Timothy Charles Farmer (C): Alderman 1967 – 11 October 1971
 Michael William Walter Farrow (C): Ealing 1970–1973
 Herbert Ferguson (Lab): Alderman 1964–1970
 Douglas Melville Fielding (C): Bexley 1967–1973; Sidcup 1973–1977
 Bill Fiske (Lab): Havering 1964–1967
 Antony Thomas Reid Fletcher (C): Ealing 1967–1970
 Jennifer Fletcher (Lab): Tottenham 5 May 1983 – 31 March 1986
 Muriel Forbes (Lab): Brent 1964–1967
 Ann M. Forbes-Cockell (C): Brent 1967–1973
 Seton Forbes-Cockell (C): Kensington and Chelsea 1964 – 19 September 1971
 Frederick James Francis (Lab): Southwark 1970–1973
 Leslie Freeman (C): Alderman 1964–1977
 Roland John Michael Freeman (C): Cities of London and Westminster 1967–1970; Finchley 15 May 1975 – 1981
 Edwin Furness (Lab): Bexley 1964–1967

G
 Maurice Patrick Gaffney (C): Ealing 1967–1970; Cities of London and Westminster 1970–1973
 Oliver John Galley (C): Harrow 1964 – 2 October 1965
 Rachel Trixie Anne Gardner (C): Havering 1970–1973; Southgate 1977 – 31 March 1986
 Montague William Garrett (C): Richmond-upon-Thames 1964–1967
 Mair Garside (Lab): Greenwich 1970–1973; Woolwich East 1973 – 31 March 1986
 Edgar Victor Garton (Lab): Alderman 1964–1970
 Diana Elizabeth Geddes (C): Lambeth 1970–1973; Streatham 1973–1977
 Rodney Charles Gent (C): Sidcup 1977 – 31 March 1986
 Ronald Gilbey (C): Haringey 1967–1973
 Peter Stuart Gill (C): Croydon South 1977 – 31 March 1986
 Lilias Girdwood Gillies (Lab): Tooting 1973–1977
 William Arthur Gillman (Lab): Havering 1964–1967
 Louis Gluckstein (C): Cities of London and Westminster 1964–1967; Alderman 1967–1973
 Reg Goodwin (Lab): Southwark 1964–1973; Bermondsey 1973–1981
 Edward Stephen Gouge (Lab): Ilford South 1981 – 31 March 1986
 John Graham (C): Ealing 1967–1970
 Alec Alan Grant (Lab): Lewisham 1964–1967 and 1970–1973
 Alan Greengross (C): Hampstead 1977 – 31 March 1986
 Anna Lloyd Grieves (Lab): Lambeth 1970–1973; Lambeth Central 1973–1981
 Michael Grylls (C): Cities of London and Westminster 1967–1970
 Muriel Gumbel (C): Lambeth 1967–1970; Kensington and Chelsea 2 December 1971 – 1973; Sutton and Cheam 1977 – 31 March 1986

H
 Rose Hacker (Lab): St. Pancras North 1973–1977
 Thomas Alfred Leefe Ham (C): Tooting 1977–1981
 John Hammond (C): Redbridge 1970–1973
 Lesley Hammond (Lab): Dulwich 1981 – 31 March 1986
 Elgar Handy (Lab): Erith and Crayford 1981 – 31 March 1986
 Alan Hardy (C): Brent 1967–1973; Brent North 1973 – 31 March 1986
 Illtyd Harrington (Lab): Brent 1964–1967; Alderman 28 April 1970 – 1973; Brent South 1973 – 31 March 1986
 Andrew Phillip Harris (Lab): Putney 1981 – 21 May 1985
 David Harris (C): Bromley 7 November 1968 – 1973; Ravensbourne 1973–1977
 John Leonard Harris (C): Putney 1977–1981
 Anthony Bernard Hart (Lab): Hornsey 1981 – 31 March 1986
 Maureen Harwood (Lab): Alderman 1973–1977
 Stephen Haseler (Lab) (Ind): Wood Green 1973–1977
 Stephen Robert Hatch (Lab): Battersea South 1973–1977
 Joseph Henry Haygarth (C): Barnet 1964–1967
 John Charles Henry (Lab): Lewisham 1964–1967 and 1970–1973; Lewisham East 1973–1977
 Alan Lewis Herbert (Lab): Lewisham West 24 April 1980 – 2 August 1984 and 20 September 1984 – 31 March 1986
 Arthur James Hichisson (C): Lewisham 1967–1970; Alderman 1970–1977
 Christopher Thomas Higgins (Lab): Ealing 1964–1967
 Ellis Hillman (Lab): Hackney 1964–1973; Hackney Central 1973–1981
 Harvey Hinds (Lab): Southwark 1967–1973; Peckham 1973 – 31 March 1986
 Roger Eden Hiskey (C): Lewisham West 1977 – 4 February 1980
 Norman Howard (Lab): Brent East 1973 – 31 March 1986
 Thomas Charles Hudson (C): Enfield 1970–1973
 Robert Gurth Hughes (C): Croydon Central 20 March 1980 – 31 March 1986
 Arthur Horace Sydney Hull (C): Hayes and Harlington 15 December 1977 – 1981
 Robert William George Humphreys (Lab): Lambeth 1964–1967

J
 Francis Herbert James (C): Redbridge 1964–1970
 Andrew Jardine (C): Alderman 1964–1967; Hounslow 1967–1973
 Margaret Christian Jay (Lab): Wandsworth 1964–1967
 Ethel Marie Jenkins (Lab): Wandsworth 1970–1973; Putney 1973–1977
 Margaret Anne Jenkins (Lab): Putney 11 July 1985 – 31 March 1986
 Thomas Alfred Jenkinson (Lab): Newham North East 1973–1977; Newham South 1977–1981
 Toby Jessel (C): Richmond-upon-Thames 1967–1973
 Julia Ada Johnson (Lab): Greenwich 1964–1967
 Ethel Winifred Jones (Lab): Ealing 1964–1967
 William Emlyn Jones (C): Harrow 1964 – 6 June 1969
 Anthony Robert Judge (Lab): Mitcham and Morden 1973–1977 and 1981 – 31 March 1986

K
 Harry Kay (Lab): Dagenham 30 January 1975 – 31 March 1986
 Alexander John Kazantzis (Lab): Camden 1970–1973; Holborn and St. Pancras South 1973–1977
 Ernest Kinghorn (Lab): Hounslow 1964–1967
 Arnold Kinzley (C): Ilford South 1977–1981
 Patricia Mary Kirwan (C): Paddington 1977–1981
 Albert George Knowlden (C): Alderman 1964–1967

L
 Harry Lamborn (Lab): Southwark 1964–1973
 Victor Rae Muske Langton (C): Bexley 1967–1973; Bexleyheath 1973 – 31 March 1986
 Alan Horace Lewis Leach (C): Sutton 1967–1973
 Robin Hubert Leach (C): Ealing 1967–1970
 Edward Leigh (C): Richmond 1977–1981
 James Anthony Lemkin (C): Uxbridge 1973 – 31 March 1986
 Rita Maisie Levy (C): Barnet 19 October 1972 – 1973
 Robert Gwilym Lewis-Jones (C): Carshalton 1977–1981
 William John Lipscombe (Lab): Hillingdon 1964–1967
 Kenneth Watson Little (Lab): Edmonton 1981 – 2 August 1984 and 20 September 1984 – 31 March 1986
 William Wycliffe Livingston (C): Lambeth 1967–1973
 Ken Livingstone (Lab): Norwood 1973–1977; Hackney North and Stoke Newington 1977–1981; Paddington 1981 – 2 August 1984 and 20 September 1984 – 31 March 1986
 Serge Lourie (Lab): Hornchurch 1973–1977
 Betty Kathleen Lowton (Lab): Waltham Forest 1964–1967
 John Vincent Norman Lucas (Lab): Battersea North 27 June 1985 – 31 March 1986

M
 Anthony McBrearty (Lab): Enfield North 1981 – 31 March 1986
 John McDonnell (Lab): Hayes and Harlington 1981 – 2 August 1984 and 20 September 1984 – 31 March 1986
 Andrew McIntosh (Lab): Tottenham 1973 – 1 March 1983
 Marjorie McIntosh (Lab): Hammersmith 1964 – 6 May 1964
 Alexander Charles Mackay (Lab): Deptford 1981 – 31 March 1986
 Alexander McLaughlin (Lab): Wandsworth 15 June 1972 – 1973
 Terence Charles McMillan (Lab): Alderman 1964–1967
 John Reveley Major (C): Hornchurch 1977–1981; Chipping Barnet 1981 – 31 March 1986
 Michael Peter Russell Malynn (C): Haringey 1967–1973
 Isita Clare Mansel (C): Camden 1967–1970
 Walter Kenneth Mansfield (Lab): Alderman 1973–1977
 Reginald Marks (C): Barnet 1964–1973; Chipping Barnet 1973–1977
 Bernard Stephen Mason (Lab): Edmonton 1973–1977
 David Michael Mason (Lab): Ealing North 1973–1977
 John Mason (C): Alderman 1964–1967; Bexley 1967–1973
 Stanley Wilfred Mayne (Lab): Alderman 1973–1977
 Sidney Aubrey Melman (Lab): Lambeth 1964–1967
 Jean Merriton (Lab): Paddington 1973–1977
 Peggy Middleton (Lab): Greenwich 1967 – 26 August 1974
 Charles Henry Miles (C): Greenwich 1967–1970
 Victor Mishcon (Lab): Lambeth 1964–1967
 Robert Mitchell (C): Redbridge 1964–1973; Wanstead and Woodford 1973 – 31 March 1986
 Ronald Dennis Mitchell (C): Feltham and Heston 1977–1981
 Victor Sidney Henry Mitchell (C): Bromley 1964–1967
 Thomas Broughton Mitcheson (C): Enfield 1964–1973; Southgate 1973–1977
 Paul David Moore (Lab): Lambeth Central 1981 – 31 March 1986
 Gladys Emma Morgan (C): Croydon 1967–1973; Croydon North East 5 September 1974 – 17 January 1980
 Joan Margaret Morgan (Lab): Hackney South and Shoreditch 1977 – 31 March 1986
 Frances Morrell (Lab): Islington South and Finsbury 1981 – 31 March 1986
 Harold Trevor Mote (C): Harrow 27 January 1966 – 1973; Harrow East 1973 – 31 March 1986
 Norman Sidney Munday (C): Waltham Forest 1967–1973
 George Edward Mynott (C): Waltham Forest 1967–1970

N
 Bob Neill (C): Romford 11 July 1985 – 31 March 1986
 Waldemar Thor Neilson-Hansen (C): Leyton 1977–1981
 George Edward Nicholson (Lab): Bermondsey 1981 – 31 March 1986

O
 Luke Patrick O'Connor (Lab): Camden 1970–1973; Alderman 1973–1977
 Peter Otwell (Lab): Brent 1964–1967

P
 George Francis Palmer (Lab): Ealing 1964–1967
 Mark Jonathan David Damian Lister Patterson (C): Ealing 1970–1973; Chipping Barnet 1977–1981
 Geoffrey Pattie (C): Lambeth 1967–1970
 Arthur Sidney Peacock (C): Barnet 1967 – 27 June 1972
 Bernard James Perkins (C): Alderman 19 October 1971 – 1973
 Jane Phillips (Lab): Hammersmith 1964–1967
 David Thomas Pitt (Lab): Hackney 1964–1973; Hackney North and Stoke Newington 1973–1977
 Peter Samuel Pitt (Lab): Feltham and Heston 1981 – 31 March 1986
 Desmond Plummer (C): Cities of London and Westminster 1964–1973; St. Marylebone 1973 – 3 March 1976
 Thomas Ponsonby (Lab): Alderman 1970–1977
 André William Potier (C): Hillingdon 1967–1970
 Fred Powe (Lab): Hounslow 1964–1967
 John Nicoll Powrie (Lab): Bexley 1964–1967
 Charles Henry Ernst Pratt (C): Bromley 1970–1973
 Charles Prendergast (Lab): Barking 1964 – 10 February 1967
 Reginald Prentice (Lab): Alderman 1970 – 29 March 1971
 Norman Prichard (Lab): Wandsworth 1964–1967, 1970 – 10 April 1972
 John Charles Putnam (C): Fulham 1977–1981

R
 Simon James Crawford Randall (C): Beckenham 1981 – 31 March 1986
 Frank Herbert Rapley (Lab): Hillingdon 1964–1967
 Edgar Ernest Reed (Lab): Southwark 1964–1970
 Margaret Rees (Lab): Woolwich West 1973–1977
 Annie Florence Remington (Lab): Haringey 1964–1967
 Albert James Retter (C): Hayes and Harlington 1977 – 22 October 1977
 Timothy J. Ridoutt (Lab): Ilford North 1973–1977
 Jenefer Gwendolen Anne Riley (C): Wood Green 1977–1981
 Sydney William Leonard Ripley (C): Kingston upon Thames 1964 – 31 March 1986
 Shelagh Marjorie Roberts (C): Havering 1970–1973; Upminster 1973–1981
 Bernard Harry Rockman (Lab): Alderman 1964–1967
 Marion Roe (C): Ilford North 1977 – 31 March 1986
 Arthur James Rolfe (C): Croydon North East 20 March 1980 – 31 March 1986
 Hazel Corinne Rose (Lab): Islington 1967–1970
 Gerald Ross (Lab): Hackney North and Stoke Newington 1981 – 31 March 1986
 Charles Andrew Rossi (Lab): Holborn and St. Pancras South 8 March 1979 – 31 March 1986
 Paul Nigel Rossi (Lab) (SDP): Lewisham East 1981 – 31 March 1986
 George Frederick Rowe (Lab): Wandsworth 1964–1967
 Stanley Graham Rowlandson (C): Enfield 1964–1973
 Bertie Edwin Roycraft (Lab): Havering 1964–1967
 Percy Rugg (C): Kensington and Chelsea 1964–1970
 Stanley Rundle (L): Richmond 1973–1977
 Peter Frank Norman Russell (Lab): Hayes and Harlington 1973–1977

S
 Samuel Isidore Salmon (C): Cities of London and Westminster 1964–1967
 Albert Samuels (Lab): Southwark 1964–1967
 Joseph Simeon Samuels (Lab): Wandsworth 1964–1967, 1970–1973
 Herbert Henry Sandford (C): St. Marylebone 8 April 1976 – 31 March 1986
 Paul Alexander Saunders (C): Croydon 1964–1967
 Mervyn Nelson Scorgie (C): Cities of London and Westminster 1970–1973; City of London and Westminster South 1973–1981
 Jean Leslie Scott (C): Barnet 1964–1973; Finchley 1973 – 20 March 1975
 Thomas William Scott (C): Merton 1964–1970
 Geoffrey John David Seaton (C): Kingston upon Thames 1964–1973; Surbiton 1973 – 27 June 1983
 Harold Sebag-Montefiore (C): Cities of London and Westminster 1964–1973
 Beatrice Serota (Lab): Lambeth 1964–1967
 Ruth Shaw (L): Sutton and Cheam 1973–1977
 Harold Shearman (Lab): Lewisham 1964–1967
 William Jeremy Masefield Shelton (C): Wandsworth 1967–1970
 Brian Joseph Shenton (C): Mitcham and Morden 1977–1981
 William Alfred Sibley (C): Havering 12 December 1968 – 1970
 Yvonne Sieve (Lab): Southall 1973 – 31 March 1986
 David Howard Simpson (Lab): Croydon North East 1973 – 18 July 1974; Alderman 21 September 1976 – 1977
 William Colbert Simson (Lab): Lewisham West 1973–1977
 Adrian Carnegie Slade (L): Richmond 1981 – 31 March 1986
 Frank Willie Smith (C): Bromley 1967–1973; Beckenham 1973–1981
 Norman John David Smith (C): Norwood 1977 – 31 March 1986
 William Christopher Smith (C): Hammersmith 1967–1970; Hammersmith North 1977–1981
 Anne Sofer (Lab) (SDP): St. Pancras North 1977 – 23 September 1981 and 29 October 1981 – 31 March 1986
 Donald Soper (Lab): Alderman 1964-13 May 1965
 Barrington John Stead (Lab): Fulham 1981 – 31 March 1986
 Maurice Stephenson (C): Alderman 29 April 1969 – 1973
 Stephen James Stewart (C): Croydon 1967–1973; Croydon North West 1977 – 31 March 1986
 Oliver Stutchbury (Lab): Alderman 1973 – 3 September 1976
 Frederick William Styles (Lab): Greenwich 24 October 1974 – 1981
 Jack Elmer Swanson (C): Wandsworth 1967–1970

T
 Jean Tatham (C): Orpington 1973 – 31 March 1986
 Cyril Julian Hebden Taylor (C): Ruislip-Northwood 1977 – 31 March 1986
 Gordon William Herbert Taylor (C): Alderman 3 October 1972 – 1977; Croydon Central 1977 – 21 January 1980
 Ruby Georgina Nancy Taylor (C): Brent 1967–1973
 Anne Sylvia Terry (C): Redbridge 1964–1967
 Frederick William Thompson (C): Sutton 1964–1967
 Robin Beauchamp Thompson (Lab): Bexley 1964–1967
 Neil Gordon Thorne (C): Redbridge 1967–1973
 Raymond David Clive Thornton (C): Havering 1967 – 13 November 1968
 Frederick Lionel Tonge (Lab): Alderman 6 July 1965 – 1967
 Frank Towell (Lab): Brent 1964–1967
 Richard Town (C): Erith and Crayford 1977–1981
 Lena Townsend (C): Camden 1967–1970; Alderman 1970–1977
 George William Tremlett (C) (Ind C): Hillingdon 1970–1973; Twickenham 1973 – 31 March 1986
 Mike Tuffrey (L): Vauxhall 11 July 1985 – 31 March 1986
 Robert Joseph Turner (C): Bromley 1964 – 27 September 1968
 Simon John Turney (Lab): Islington Central 1977 – 31 March 1986

U
 John Oliver Udal (C): Alderman 1967–1973
 Dyas Cyril Loftus Usher (C): Hounslow 1967–1973

V
 Gerard Folliott Vaughan (C): Lambeth 1967–1970; Alderman 1970 – 18 September 1972
 Robert Louis Vigars (C): Kensington and Chelsea 1964–1973; Kensington 1973 – 31 March 1986
 Louis Albert Vitoria (Lab): Haringey 1964–1967

W
 Jeremy James Wagg (C): Hammersmith 1967–1970
 Frederick William Walker (C): Merton 1964–1973
 John James Walsh (Lab): Leyton 1973–1977
 Lady Walton (Nellie Margaret Walton) (C): Alderman 1967 – 2 October 1968
 John Benjamin Ward (Lab): Barking 1970–1973; Barking 1973 – 31 March 1986
 Michael Ward (Lab): Wood Green 1981 – 31 March 1986
 John Golden Warren (Lab): Alderman 1973–1977
 William Watts (Lab): Alderman 28 April 1970 – 1973
 Gordon Alexander Webb (C): Waltham Forest 1967–1973
 Mavis Joan Webster (Lab): Waltham Forest 1964 – 27 November 1966
 David Christopher Wetzel (Lab): Hammersmith North 1981 – 31 March 1986
 Frederick Walter Weyer (C): Lewisham 1967–1970; Streatham 1977 – 31 March 1986
 Michael John Wheeler (C): Lewisham 1967–1970; Ravensbourne 1977 – 31 March 1986
 David Frank White (Lab): Croydon Central 1973–1977
 John Howard White (Lab): Enfield North 1973–1977
 Arthur Wicks (Lab): Hackney 1964–1967; Islington 1967–1973; Islington South and Finsbury 1973–1981
 Alan Ronald Williams (Lab): Hornchurch 1981 – 31 March 1986
 Margaret Williams (C): Battersea South 1977–1981
 Phillip Charles Desmond Williams (C): Waltham Forest 1970–1973
 John Wilson (Lab): Newham North East 1977 – 31 March 1986
 Valerie Wise (Lab): Battersea South 1981 – 31 March 1986
 Enid Barbara Wistrich (Lab): Hampstead 1973–1977
 Deirdre Frances Mary Wood (Lab): Greenwich 1981 – 31 March 1986
 Joan Kathleen Wykes (C): Chislehurst 1973 – 31 March 1986

Y
 George Young (C): Ealing 1970–1973
 James Young (Lab): Greenwich 1964–1967
 Robin Ainsworth Raine Young (Lab): Walthamstow 1973–1981

Parties
C: Conservative Party
Ind: Independent
Ind C: Unofficial Conservative
L: Liberal Party
Lab: Labour Party
SDP: Social Democratic Party